Ed Cannaday (born October 31, 1940) is an American politician who served in the Oklahoma House of Representatives from the 15th district from 2006 to 2018.

Biography
Cannaday was born in Radisson, Wisconsin. He served in the United States Army from 1959 to 1962 and was promoted to sergeant. Cannadday received his bachelor's and master's degrees, in education and history, from University of Tulsa in 1968 and 1969. Cannaday also received an associate degree from Cameron University. He taught school in Oklahoma and Wisconsin. Cannaday owned a dairy farm and a meat processing plan in Porum, Oklahoma. Cannaday served on the Porum Board of Education from 1980 to 1988.

References

1940 births
Living people
People from Muskogee County, Oklahoma
People from Sawyer County, Wisconsin
Military personnel from Wisconsin
University of Tulsa alumni
Cameron University alumni
Businesspeople from Oklahoma
Farmers from Oklahoma
Educators from Wisconsin
Educators from Oklahoma
School board members in Oklahoma
Democratic Party members of the Oklahoma House of Representatives